Danielle Cameranesi (born June 3, 1995) is an American women's ice hockey forward, currently playing for the Minnesota section of the PWHPA. She made her debut for the US national women's team at the 2014 4 Nations Cup in Kamloops, British Columbia, Canada.

Playing career
During the 2010–11 season, she registered 79 points (35 goals, 44 assists) while serving as team captain with The Blake School. Of note, the team was also conference champions.

USA Hockey
In August 2011, she was named to the under-18 U.S. team that competed versus Canada in a three-game series in Rockland, Ontario.
In the USA's 13–1 defeat of the Czech Republic at the 2012 IIHF World Women's U18 Championship, Cameranesi assisted on Molly Illikainen's goal.

She was named to the roster of the United States national women's ice hockey team that shall compete at the 2015 IIHF Women's World Championship.

On January 2, 2022, Cameranesi was named to Team USA's roster to represent the United States at the 2022 Winter Olympics. On July 20, 2022, Cameranesi announced her retirement from international competition. She finished her career with 24 goals and 58 points in 87 games.

NCAA
During the 2013–14 season in her freshman year, she recorded 19 goals and 17 assists. She was the leading scorer among WCHA freshmen and finished tied for ninth among all league scorers. Following the season she was named the inaugural National Rookie of the Year.

Donning the maroon and gold during exhibition play, she first appeared with the Golden Gophers in a September 26 contest versus the Japanese national team. With Japan having qualified for the 2014 Sochi Winter Games, it was a unique display of women's hockey. Cameranesi would log an even strength goal to give Minnesota a 3–0 lead in the second period. Minnesota would prevail by a 6–0 tally.

The following day, she scored a goal versus the University of British Columbia in the third period of a 7–0 whitewash at Ridder Arena. Perhaps more impressive was that said goal was scored against former Canadian national team member Danielle Dube.

She would register the first points of her NCAA career on October 12, 2013, in a 2–0 shutout victory over the rival Wisconsin Badgers. Cameranesi registered two assists on a pair of even-strength goals in the third period which were both scored by Kelly Terry.

NWHL
On June 12, 2018, Cameranesi signed with the Buffalo Beauts of the National Women's Hockey League.

Career statistics

Regular season and playoffs

USA Hockey

Awards and honors
2010 Minnesota All-State honoree
2011 Minnesota All-State honoree
2011 Most Valuable Player, Blake School
2013 Minnesota Ms. Hockey Award
2014 Women's Hockey Commissioners Association National Rookie of the Year
2015 CCM Hockey Women's Division I All-Americans, Second Team

WCHA
WCHA Player of the Week (Week of October 21)
WCHA Offensive Player of the Week, (Week of February 17, 2015)
WCHA Offensive Player of the Week, (Week of February 24, 2015)

References

External links

Minnesota Golden Gophers bio

1995 births
Living people
American women's ice hockey forwards
Buffalo Beauts players
Ice hockey players from Minnesota
Ice hockey players at the 2018 Winter Olympics
Ice hockey players at the 2022 Winter Olympics
Medalists at the 2018 Winter Olympics
Medalists at the 2022 Winter Olympics
Minnesota Golden Gophers women's ice hockey players
Olympic gold medalists for the United States in ice hockey
Olympic silver medalists for the United States in ice hockey
People from Plymouth, Minnesota
Professional Women's Hockey Players Association players